The home-ownership rate in the United States is the percentage of homes that are owned by their occupants.  In 2009, it remained similar to that in some other post-industrial nations with 67.4% of all occupied housing units being occupied by the unit's owner. Home-ownership rates vary depending on demographic characteristics of households such as ethnicity, race, type of household as well as location and type of settlement. In 2018, home-ownership dropped to a lower rate than it was in 1994, with a rate of 64.2%. 
 
Since 1960, the home-ownership rate in the United States has remained relatively stable. It has decreased 1.0% since 1960, when 65.2% of American households owned their own home. Additionally, homeowner equity has fallen steadily since World War II and is now less than 50% of the value of homes on average.  Home-ownership was most common in rural areas and suburbs, with three quarters of suburban households being homeowners. Among the country's regions, the Midwestern United States had the highest home-ownership rate and the Western United States had the lowest. Recent research has examined the decline in home-ownership rates among households with "heads" aged 25 to 44 years. The rates fell substantially between 1980 and 2000, and recovered only partially during the United States housing bubble of the early 2000s. This research indicates that a trend toward marrying later and the increase in household earnings risk that occurred after 1980 account for a large share of the decline in young home-ownership.

In general, homeowners in the United States also tend to have higher incomes. Households residing in their own home were more likely to be families (as opposed to individuals) than were their tenant counterparts. Among racial demographics, White Americans had the country's highest home-ownership rate, while African Americans had the lowest home-ownership rate. One study shows that home-ownership rates appear correlated with higher school attainment.

The name "home-ownership rate" can be misleading. As defined by the US Census Bureau, it is the percentage of homes that are occupied by the owner. It is not the percentage of adults that own their own home. This latter percentage will be significantly lower than the home-ownership rate. Many households that are owner-occupied contain adult relatives (often young adults, descendants of the owner) who do not own their own home. Single building multi-bedroom rental units can contain more than one adult, all of whom do not own a home.

The term "home-ownership rate" can also be misleading because it includes households that owe on a mortgage. Which means that they do not fully own the equity in their own home, which they are said to "own". According to ATTOM Data Research, only "34 percent of all American homeowners have 100 percent equity in their properties — they’ve either paid off their entire mortgage debt or they never had a mortgage".

According to CNBC, the median sell price for a U.S. home in 2017 was US$199,200. By February 2023, the median sell price increased to US$392,000 according to Statista.  The growing U.S. housing shortage is a major factor in home prices increasing so rapidly.

Measuring method
In the United States, the home ownership rate is created through the Housing Vacancy Survey by the U.S. Census Bureau. It is created by dividing the owner occupied units by the total number of occupied units. This is an important point to understand changes in the home ownership rate over time. The bust of the housing bubble resulted in many houses becoming foreclosed. However, the decrease in the home ownership rate from 3Q2007 to 4Q2007 was mostly a result of an increase in the renter's population and less due to a decrease in the homeowner population.

Government policy
Homeownership has been promoted as government policy using several means involving mortgage debt and the government sponsored entities Freddie Mac, Fannie Mae, and the Federal Home Loan Banks, which fund or guarantee $6.5 trillion of assets with the purpose of directly or indirectly promoting homeownership. Homeownership has been further promoted through tax policy which allows a tax deduction for mortgage interest payments on a primary residence. The Community Reinvestment Act also encourages homeownership for low-income earners. The promotion of homeownership by the government through encouraging mortgage borrowing and lending has given rise to debates regarding government policies and the subprime mortgage crisis.

Race

The homeownership rate, as well as its change over time, has varied significantly by race. While homeowners constitute the majority of white, Asian and Native American households, the homeownership rates for African Americans and Latinos have typically fallen short of the fifty percent threshold. Whites have had the highest homeownership rate, followed by Asians and Native Americans.

Although a landmark United States Supreme Court ruling Shelley v. Kraemer , ruled invalid exclusionary racial covenants, which almost always barred black citizens from owning a home but often extended to American Jews, Asian Americans, Mexican Americans, and non-citizens and other ethnic groups and could be used by white real estate owners to enforce or introduce racial segregation, threats of legal action allowed them to remain effective for some time afterwards.  Racial steering practices later on also affected patterns of home ownership among non-whites and the cumulative effects of exclusionary covenants, racial steering, and other segregation measures have resulted in lower property values, less capital accumulation, lower municipal tax revenues, and disinvestment in black communities.  Despite the fact that the Shelley v. Kraemer decision found exclusionary covenants to be unconstitutional under the Fourteenth Amendment to the United States Constitution's Equal Protection Clause  ago, and hence unenforceable, the clauses are still present in many deeds well into the twenty-first century.

Hispanics had the lowest homeownership rate in the country in all years, except for 2002, up until 2005. For the last half of the decade of the 2000s the homeownership rate for Hispanics exceeded that of African Americans. Temporal fluctuations were slight for all races, with rates commonly not changing more than two percentage points per year.

The strongest increase in the percentage of homeowners in the first half of the decade of the 2000s was among non-white minorities. The homeownership rate for minorities approached the sixty percent mark in 2006, which was a significant change because less than half of all minority households owned homes as recently as 1994. The ownership rate for minorities increased by 25.6%, from 47.7% in 1993 to 59.9% in 2006. This rate fell after the 2006 peak, consistent with overall homeownership rates.

The increase among white Americans was less substantial. In 2005, 75.8% of white Americans owned their own homes, compared to 70% in 1993, and the rate fell during the last half of the decade of the 2000s, slightly more slowly than for the rest of the population. Thus one can conclude that despite a large remaining discrepancy between the homeownership rates among different racial groups, the gap had been closing up until the peak, with ownership rates increasing more substantially for minorities than for whites, but subsequently began slightly widening.

SOURCE: US Census Bureau, 2016

Type of household

There is a strong correlation between the type and age of a household's family structure and homeownership. As of 2006, married couple families, which also have the highest median income of any household type, were most likely to own a home. Age played a significant role as well with homeownership increasing with the age of the householder until age 65, when a slight decrease becomes visible. While only 43% of households with a householder under the age of thirty-five owned a home, 81.6% of those with a householder between the ages of 55 and 64 did.

This means that households with a middle-aged householder were nearly twice as likely to own a home as those with a young householder. Overall married couple families with a householder age 70 to 74 had the highest homeownership rate with 93.3% being homeowners. The lowest homeownership rate was recorded for single females under the age of twenty-five of whom only 13.6%, were homeowners. Yet, single females had an overall higher homeownership rate than single males and single mothers.

Income

There are considerable correlations between income, homeownership rate and housing characteristics. As income is closely linked to social status, sociologist Leonard Beeghley has made the hypothesis that "the lower the social class, then the fewer amenities built into housing." According to 2002, US Census Bureau data housing characteristics vary considerably with income. A slight majority, 54% of homes occupied by owners in this group had two or more bathrooms.

According to a 2004 report, among homeowners with household incomes in the top 10%, those earning more than $120,000 a year, home values were considerably higher while houses were larger and newer. The median value for homes in this demographic was $256,000 while median square footage was 2,500 and the median year of construction was 1977. The vast majority, 80%, had two or more bathrooms. Overall, houses of those with higher incomes were larger, newer, more expensive with more amenities.

U.S. home prices are rising significantly faster than incomes.  After accounting for inflation, home prices jumped 118% from 1965 to 2021, while income has only increase by 15%.  High demand and low supply in most cities will likely continue to keep home prices outpacing income increases.

Political influence
Homeownership influences the political participation of individuals, with homeowners more likely to participate in local elections. Owning a home increases the likelihood of participating in local primaries by 35%. Voter turnout probability increases with the value of the home. Becoming a homeowner influences an individual's political outlook, as they are more likely to vote in ways they perceive as protecting their investment. Being a homeowner increases the likelihood of political participation by 75% when issue of zoning are decided. For national elections, homeowners are more likely than renters to participate in primaries and general elections; their turnout is about 10 points higher than renters for general elections.

For those who use private mortgages to finance homeownership, their party affiliation polarizes towards one of the two major political parties. Individuals who buy homes through Federal Housing Administration-supported mortgages are much more likely to become Democrats.

Historical

International comparison (2002)

See also

List of countries by home ownership rate
Household income in the United States
Real estate pricing
Economy of the United States
Housing insecurity in the United States
Eviction in the United States
Poverty in the United States
Homelessness in the United States

Footnotes

References

Further reading
 Kwak, Nancy H. A World of Homeowners: American Power and the Politics of Housing Aid ( University of Chicago Press, 2015). 328 pp.
 Thurston, Chloe N. (2018). At the Boundaries of Homeownership: Credit, Discrimination, and the American State. Cambridge University Press.

External links
U.S. Census Bureau's Housing Vacancy Survey

Wealth in the United States
Economy of the United States
Housing in the United States
Ownership